This is a list of IMAX venues that feature either 15/70 mm film projectors or IMAX with Laser projectors. Not included are IMAX venues with solely 2K resolution digital xenon projectors. Traditional 15/70 mm IMAX locations use 70 mm film projectors, with the film running through the projector(s) horizontally, each frame being 15 perforations wide. 3D presentations are shown using two projectors and either linear polarized or LCD shutter glasses. These locations are capable of displaying aspect ratios as tall as 1.43:1.

IMAX with Laser locations can use two 4K resolution digital projectors with laser light sources to project 3D content using wavelength multiplex visualization in a similar fashion to Dolby 3D. IMAX GT Laser (dual 4K 3D projectors) and IMAX Laser Dome (single 4K projector) are capable of displaying aspect ratios as tall as 1.43:1.

Dome theaters may indicate one or two screen sizes.  The first (or only) number indicates the screen diameter.  The second number (if present) indicates the screen surface width.

All cinemas feature IMAX with Laser and 3D projection with 1.90:1 screens unless noted otherwise.

Australia 
 Melbourne – IMAX Melbourne Museum (15/70 and IMAX GT Laser, 1.43:1)

Austria 
Graz - CineplexX Graz & IMAX

Vienna - CineplexX Apollo Vienna & IMAX

Bahamas 

Nassau – Fusion Superplex (IMAX GT Laser, 1.43:1)

Belgium 

 Brussels – Kinepolis Brussel (IMAX GT Laser, 1.43:1)
 Charleroi – Pathé Charleroi
 Antwerp – Kinepolis Antwerpen

Canada

Alberta 
 Calgary – Scotiabank Theatre Chinook (15/70 and IMAX Digital, 1.43:1)
 Edmonton – Telus World of Science
 Edmonton – Scotiabank Theatre (15/70 and IMAX Digital, 1.43:1)

British Columbia 
 Langley – Cineplex (15/70 and IMAX Digital, 1.43:1)
 Vancouver – Science World at Telus World of Science IMAX Dome (15/70, 2D)
 Victoria – Royal British Columbia Museum (IMAX GT Laser, 1.43:1)

Nova Scotia 
 Halifax – Scotiabank Theatre Halifax (15/70 and IMAX Digital, 1.43:1)

Ontario 
 Mississauga – Cineplex Cinemas Mississauga (15/70 and IMAX Digital, 1.43:1)
 Sudbury – Science North
 Toronto – Cinesphere, Ontario Place (15/70 and IMAX GT Laser, 1.43:1)
 Toronto – Ontario Science Centre IMAX Dome (15/70, 2D)
 Toronto – Scotiabank Theatre Toronto (IMAX GT Laser, 1.43:1)
 Vaughan – Cineplex Cinemas Vaughan (15/70 and IMAX Digital, 1.43:1)

Quebec 
 Montreal – Cinéma Banque Scotia Montréal (15/70 and IMAX Digital, 1.43:1)
 Montreal – Telus, Montreal Science Centre (IMAX GT Laser, 1.43:1)
 Quebec City – Galeries de la Capitale() (15/70 and IMAX Digital, 1.43:1)

Saskatchewan 
 Regina – Saskatchewan Science Centre (15/70, 1.43:1)

China

Beijing 
 Chaoyang – China National Film Museum (IMAX GT Laser, 1.43:1)
 Chaoyang – China Science and Technology Museum (15/70)
 Chaoyang – IMAX Dome, China Science and Technology Museum (15/70, 2D)
 Haidian – Beijing Qinghe CGV & IMAX Cineplex (16.48m×8.31m)
Chaoyang – Beijing Emperor Center & IMAX
Chaoyang – Beijing FangYuanLi ID Mall Bona & IMAX
Shijingshan – Beijing ShiJingShan Wanda & IMAX
Fangshan – Beijing FangShan Wanda & IMAX
Tongzhou – Universal Beijing Resort Universal City Walk & IMAX

Chongqing 
 Yubei – IMAX Dome, Chongqing Children's Palace (15/70, 2D)
 Jiangbei – Science and Technology Museum (15/70)

Fujian 
 Fuzhou – Fuzhou Strait Culture Art Center Jinyi & IMAX
 Xiamen – Xiamen Huli Wanda & IMAX

Guangdong 
 Guangzhou – Guangzhou New Park Mei Ah & IMAX
 Guangzhou – Guangzhou Rock Square Flying & IMAX
 Dongguan – IMAX Dome, Dongguan Science and Technology Centre (15/70, 2D)
  Dongguan – Wanda Cinema (IMAX GT Laser, 1.43:1)
Shenzhen – Shenzhen One Avenue CGV & IMAX
 Shenzhen – Shenzhen Maxland Jinyi & IMAX
 Shenzhen – Shenzhen Pafc Mall Emperor & IMAX
 Shenzhen – Shenzhen Longgang Tian An Mixc & IMAX
 Maoming – Maoming Donghui & IMAX

Guangxi 
 Nanning – Nanning Qingxiu Wanda & IMAX

Guizhou 
 Guiyang - Guiyang The Future Ark Cross & IMAX (IMAX GT Laser, 1.90:1)
Guiyang – Guiyang INCITY CGV & IMAX
Guiyang – Guiyang Zhongda Wanda & IMAX

Hebei 
Shijiazhuang – Shijiazhuang Mixc & IMAX

Heilongjiang 
 Harbin – IMAX Dome, Heilongjiang Science & Technology Museum (15/70, 2D)
  Harbin – Tai Lai Era (IMAX GT Laser, 1.43:1)
Harbin – Harbin Mixc & IMAX
Harbin – Haxi Wanda Plaza IMAX
Daqing – IMAX Dome, Daqing Science and Technology Museum (15/70, 2D)

Henan 
 Zhengzhou – Zhengzhou Yoyo Park CGV & IMAX
 Zhengzhou – Zhengzhou Wanda Erqi & IMAX

Hubei 
 Wuhan – Wuhan Wushang Moore & IMAX

Hunan 
 Changsha – Changsha Wanda & IMAX

Jiangsu 
Nanjing – IMAX Dome, Nanjing Juvenile Science and Technology Centre (15/70, 2D)
Nanjing – Nanjing Unimall Omnijoi & IMAX
Suzhou – Kunshan Mixc & IMAX
Wuxi – Wuxi Livat Jinyi & IMAX
 Wuxi – Wuxi Big World & IMAX
 Wuxi – Wuxi Yaohan CGV & IMAX

Jiangxi 
 Nanchang – Nanchang MixC & IMAX

Liaoning 
Shenyang – IMAX Theatre, Liaoning Science & Technology (IMAX GT Laser, 1.43:1)
Shenyang – Shenyang Olympic Wanda IMAX (22.19m×11.61m)
Dalian – Dalian Jingkai Wanda & IMAX

Inner Mongolia 
 Hohhot – Hohhot East Xinhua Road Wanda & IMAX

Shandong 
 Jinan – Jinan Gaoxin Wanda & IMAX
 Jinan – Jinan Mixc & IMAX
Qingdao – Qingdao Wanda CBD Cinema IMAX

Shanghai 
 Pudong – IMAX Dome, Shanghai Science and Technology Museum (23m) (15/70, 2D)
 Pudong – Shanghai Science and Technology Museum (15/70)
Jing'an – Shanghai Daning Imix Perk Hoyts & IMAX
Jinshan – Shanghai Jinshan Wanda & IMAX
Baoshan – Wanda Shanghai Baoshan & IMAX
Huangpu – Shanghai One East Palace & IMAX
Hongkou – Jinyi Cinema & IMAX

Shanxi 
 Taiyuan – Taiyuan Wanda & IMAX
 Taiyuan – Taiyuan Mixc & IMAX

Sichuan 
Chengdu – Chengdu Mixc Ph2 Broadway & IMAX
 Chengdu – Chengdu Shin Kong Plaza Emperor & IMAX

Yunnan 
 Kunming – PanXing Dadu LLC Cinema (IMAX GT Laser, 1.43:1)
 Kunming – Kunming Xishan Wanda & IMAX

Zhejiang 
 Ningbo – Ningbo Mixc & IMAX

France 
 Archamps – Cinema Gaumont
 Conflans-Sainte-Honorine – Cinema Pathé Conflans
 La Valette-du-Var – Cinéma Pathé La Valette
 Les Pennes-Mirabeau – Cinéma Pathé Plan de Campagne (IMAX GT Laser)
 Marne-la-Vallée – Gaumont Disney Village (Disneyland Paris)
 Montpellier – Cinéma Gaumont Montpellier Multiplexe (IMAX GT Laser, 1.43:1)
 Paris – La Geode IMAX Dome (15/70, 2D)
 Poitiers – Futuroscope:
 KinéMAX (Laser, 1.43:1)
 IMAX 3D Dynamique (15/70)
 Saran – Pathé Saran
 Thillois – Cinéma Gaumont Parc Millésime
 Toulouse – Cinéma Gaumont Labège
 Toulouse – Cité De L'Espace (15/70)

Finland 
 Helsinki – Finnkino Itis

Germany 
Berlin – UCI Luxe, Mercedes Platz
 Karlsruhe – Filmpalast, ZKM IMAX (IMAX GT Laser, 1.43:1)
Kassel – Filmpalast
Leonberg – Traumpalast (Currently the largest IMAX screen in the world)
 Sinsheim – Auto & Technik Museum (IMAX GT Laser, 1.43:1)
 Speyer – IMAX Dome, Technik Museum (15/70, 2D)

Hong Kong 
 Kowloon – IMAX Dome, Hong Kong Space Museum (15/70 and Digital, 2D)
 Kowloon - MCL Cinemas IMAX @ K11 Art House (20.7m×11.77m) 
 Kowloon - Emperor Cinemas IMAX @ iSquare  (Currently the largest IMAX theatre in Hong Kong.)

India 

Ahmedabad - Gujarat Science City IMAX (15/70, 1.43:1) (Doesn't screen commercial films)
Delhi- PVR Select City Walk
Mumbai - PVR Phoenix

Indonesia 

 Jakarta – Keong Emas Theater, Taman Mini Indonesia Indah (15/70, 1.43:1, 2D)
 Jakarta – Cinema XXI, Gandaria City
 Jakarta - Cinema XXI, Mall Kelapa Gading

Italy 
 Orio al Serio (Bergamo) – UCI Cinemas Orio (Oriocenter shopping center)

Japan 

Fujisawa – 109 Cinemas Shonan
Hakata Ward – United Cinemas Canal City 13
Ichikawa – AEON CINEMA Ichikawa Myoden
Kagoshima – Kagoshima Municipal Science Hall (The only OMNIMAX and 15/70 film venue in Japan. Mostly shows documentaries and films related to astronomy.)
Kawasaki – 109 Cinemas Kawasaki
Kōtō – 109 Cinemas Kiba
Kuki – 109 Cinemas Shobu
Machida – 109 Cinemas Grandberry Park
Matsudo – United Cinemas Terrace Mall Matsudo
Nagareyama – TOHO Cinemas Nagareyama Otakanomori
Nakamura Ward – 109 Cinemas Nagoya
Numazu – Cinema Sunshine LaLaport Numazu
Sapporo – United Cinemas Sapporo
Setagaya – 109 Cinemas Futako Tamagawa
Shijōnawate – AEON CINEMA Shijonawate
Shinjuku – TOHO Cinemas Shinjuku
 Suita – 109 Cinemas Osaka Expocity (IMAX GT Laser, 1.43:1)
Toshima – Grand Cinema Sunshine (IMAX GT Laser, 1.43:1, Largest IMAX screen in Japan at 25.8m×18.9m)
Toshimaen – United Cinemas Toshimaen
Urasoe – United Cinemas PARCO CITY Urasoe
Urawa Ward – United Cinemas Urawa
 Yamatokōriyama – Cinema Sunshine Yamatokōriyama
 Yūrakuchō – TOHO Cinemas Hibiya

Kuwait 
 Kuwait City – Scientific Center of Kuwait (IMAX GT Laser, 1.43:1)

Latvia 
 Riga - Kino Apollo, Akropole Riga

Malaysia

 Putrajaya - GSC IOI City Mall

Mexico 
Aguascalientes – Descubre Museo Interactivo de Ciencia y Tecnología IMAX Dome (15/70, 2D)
Monterrey – Megapantalla IMAX Banorte Papalote Museo del Niño Monterrey
Mexico City Papalote Museo Del Niño
Tijuana, Baja California – Centro Cultural de Tijuana (CECUT), IMAX Dome (15/70, 2D)

Netherlands 
 Amsterdam – Pathé Arena
 Eindhoven - Pathé Eindhoven
 The Hague – Pathé Spuimarkt
 Rotterdam – Pathé Schouwburgplein
 Tilburg - Pathé Tilburg Centrum

New Zealand 
 Auckland – Event Cinemas Queen Street  (IMAX GT Laser, 1.43:1)
 Lower Hutt - Event Cinemas Queensgate

Norway 
 Oslo – ODEON Oslo

Philippines 
 Pasay, Metro Manila – SM Mall of Asia (15/70 and IMAX Digital, 1.43:1)
 Las Piñas – Vista Cinemas, Evia Lifestyle Center

Qatar 
 Doha – Novo Cinema, Mall Of Qatar

Russia 
 Moscow – Formula Kino Kutuzovsky
 Moscow – Kinomax Titan

Saudi Arabia 
Hafar al-Batin - AMC Cinemas
Khobar - Scitech IMAX (15/70).
Jeddah - VOX Cinemas, Red Sea Mall
Jeddah - VOX Cinemas, Town Square

Riyadh - AMC Al Khair 9 and IMAX

Serbia 

Belgrade - Cineplexx Galerija Belgrade

Singapore 
Singapore – Shaw Theaters Jewel
Singapore –Shaw Theatres Lido
Singapore – Shaw Theatres Paya Lebar Quarter

South Korea 
 Seoul – CGV Yongsan I-Park Mall (IMAX GT Laser, 1.43:1)
 Suwon – CGV Gwanggyo

Spain 
 Valencia – IMAX Dome, City of Arts and Sciences (15/70, 2D)

Sweden 
 Stockholm – Cosmonova, Swedish Museum of Natural History (15/70 OMNIMAX), Westfield Mall of Scandinavia
 Gothenburg – Filmstaden Bergakungen

Switzerland 
 Ebikon – Pathé Mall of Switzerland

Taiwan 
 Taipei – Miramar (IMAX GT Laser, 1.43:1)
 Hualien - Paradiso VieShow Cinemas

Thailand 
 Bangkok – Krungsri IMAX Paragon Cineplex, Siam Paragon (Thailand's largest IMAX screen.) 
Bangkok – GSB IMAX Icon CineConic, Iconsiam 
Samut Prakan – IMAX Mega Cineplex, Central Mega Bangna

Ukraine 
 Kyiv – Multiplex IMAX at Lavina Mall
 Kyiv – Multiplex IMAX at Respublika Park Mall
 Kyiv – Planeta Kino IMAX at River Mall

United Arab Emirates 
 Abu Dhabi - VOX Al Maryah
 Dubai – Novo IMG Dubai
 Dubai – VOX Cinemas, Mall of the Emirates

United Kingdom 

 Ashford – Cineworld, Eureka Entertainment Centre 1.43:1 (Single Laser 1.90:1)
 Barnsley – Cineworld 
 Belfast – Cineworld, Odyssey 1.43:1 (Single Laser 1.90:1)
 Gateshead - Odeon, Metrocentre 
 Glasgow - Cineworld Silverburn
 London – BFI IMAX 1.43:1  (15/70 1.43:1 and Single Laser 1.90:1)
 London – Cineworld, Leicester Square (GT Laser)
 London – Science Museum (15/70 and GT Laser 1.43:1)
 Manchester – Vue, The Printworks (GT Laser 1.43:1)
Manchester - Odeon, Trafford Centre()
 Rushden – Cineworld, Rushden Lakes
 Sheffield – Cineworld, Valley Centertainment
 Watford – Cineworld, Intu Watford
York - Cineworld, York Community Stadium (22.29mx16.81m 1.43:1) (Single Laser 1.90:1)

United States

Alabama 
 Birmingham – IMAX Dome, McWane Science Center (IMAX Laser Dome, 2D, 1.43:1)

Arizona 
 Grand Canyon – National Geographic Visitor Center (15/70, 2D, 1.43:1)

 Tempe – Harkins Theatres Arizona Mills 18 & IMAX (15/70 and Digital, 1.43:1)

California 
Burbank - AMC Burbank 16 & IMAX
City of Industry - AMC Puente 20
 Dublin – Regal Hacienda Crossings Stadium 21 (IMAX GT Laser, 1.43:1)
 Montclair - AMC Dine-In Montclair Place 12 & IMAX
 Fresno – Regal Edwards Fresno Stadium 22 & IMAX (IMAX GT Laser, 1.43:1)
 Hollywood – Grauman's Chinese Theatre
 Irvine – Regal Edwards Irvine Spectrum 21
Los Angeles – AMC Century City 15 & IMAX
 Los Angeles – California Science Center (IMAX GT Laser, 1.43:1)
 Orange – AMC 30 at the Block & IMAX
 San Diego – Heikoff Giant Dome Theater, Fleet Science Center (IMAX Laser Dome, 2D, 1.43:1)
 San Francisco – AMC Metreon 16 (IMAX GT Laser, 1.43:1)
 San Jose – The Tech Museum of Innovation Hackworth IMAX Dome Theater (IMAX Laser Dome, 2D, 1.43:1)
Santa Clara - AMC Mercado 20 & IMAX
Sunnyvale - AMC DINE-IN Sunnyvale 12 & IMAX
Torrance - AMC Del Amo 18 & IMAX
 Universal City – AMC Universal Citywalk Stadium 19 (IMAX GT Laser, 1.43:1)

Colorado 
Denver - AMC Westminster Promenade 24 & IMAX
 Denver – Denver Museum of Nature and Science - Phipps IMAX Theater (15/70)

Connecticut 
Milford - Connecticut Post 14 & IMAX (IMAX GT Laser)

District of Columbia 
 Washington, D.C. – Lockheed Martin IMAX Theater, National Air and Space Museum (IMAX GT Laser, 1.43:1)

Florida 
 Delrey Beach – Paragon Theaters Delrey
 Fort Lauderdale – Autonation, Museum of Discovery and Science (15/70 and IMAX GT Laser, 1.43:1)
 Kennedy Space Center – Visitors Center IMAX #1 (15/70, 1.43:1)
 Kennedy Space Center – Visitors Center IMAX #2 (1.43:1)

Georgia 
 Buford – Regal Mall of Georgia 20 (15/70 and Laser)
 Pooler – Royal Cinemas (GT Laser, 1.43:1)

Illinois 
Woodridge - Cinemark at Seven Bridges and IMAX (15/70 and IMAX Digital, 3D)

Indiana 
 Indianapolis – Indiana State Museum (15/70 and IMAX Digital)

Iowa 
 Waukee - The Palm Theaters and IMAX

Kentucky 
 Newport - AMC Newport On The Levee 20 (15/70)

Louisiana 
Shreveport - Goodman IMAX Dome (IMAX Laser Dome)

Maryland 
Columbia - AMC Columbia 14 & IMAX
Gaithersburg - AMC Rio Cinemas 18 & IMAX

Massachusetts 
 Boston – Mugar Omni Theater, Museum of Science IMAX Dome (IMAX Laser Dome, 2D, 1.43:1)
 Methuen – AMC Methuen 20 & IMAX
 Reading – Jordan's IMAX, Sunbrella (IMAX GT Laser, 1.43:1)

Michigan 
 Detroit - Michigan Science Center IMAX Dome (15/70, 2D)

Minnesota 
Roseville – AMC Rosedale 14 & IMAX
 St. Paul – Science Museum of Minnesota. A dual-screen system with a standard IMAX screen and a dome screen. (2D)

Missouri 
 Branson – IMAX Entertainment Complex (IMAX GT Laser, 1.43:1)
Kansas City - AMC Barry Woods 24
 St. Louis – Saint Louis Science Center OMNIMAX (IMAX Laser Dome, 2D, 1.43:1)

Nebraska 
 Omaha – Henry Doorly Zoo (15/70)

New Jersey 
Cherry Hill - AMC Cherry Hill 24 & IMAX
New Brunswick - AMC New Brunswick 18 & IMAX
Paramus - AMC Garden State 16 & IMAX
Rockaway - AMC Rockaway 16 & IMAX

New York 
New York City – AMC 34th Street 14 & IMAX
New York City – AMC Kips Bay 15 & IMAX
New York City – AMC Lincoln Square 13 & IMAX (15/70 and IMAX GT Laser, 1.43:1)
New York City – American Museum of Natural History (IMAX GT and IMAX Digital)
 New York City – AMC Empire 25
 New Rochelle – Regal New Roc Stadium 18 & IMAX (15/70 and Laser)

North Carolina 
 Charlotte – Charlotte Observer IMAX Dome Theatre, Discovery Place (15/70, 2D)

Ohio 
 Beavercreek - Cinemark The Greene 14 & IMAX (15/70)
 Cincinnati – Robert D. Lindner Family OMNIMAX Theater, Cincinnati Museum Center at Union Terminal IMAX Dome (2D)
 Springdale - Showcase Cinema de Lux Springdale (15/70)
 West Chester Township - AMC West Chester 18 (15/70)

Oklahoma 
Moore - Warren Theater and IMAX

Pennsylvania 
King of Prussia – Regal UA King of Prussia & IMAX
 Philadelphia – IMAX Dome, Franklin Institute Science Museum (15/70, 2D)

Rhode Island 
 Providence – National Amusements Providence Place Cinemas 16 (IMAX GT and IMAX Digital)

Tennessee 
 Chattanooga – Tennessee Aquarium (IMAX GT Laser, 1.43:1)
 Nashville – Regal Opry Mills 20 & IMAX

Texas 
 Austin – Bullock Texas State History Museum (IMAX GT Laser, 1.43:1)
 Dallas – AMC Northpark 15
 Fort Worth – Omni Theater, Fort Worth Museum of Science and History IMAX Dome (15/70, 2D)
 Houston – AMC Willowbrook 24
Houston – Regal Edwards Houston Marq*E & IMAX 
 San Antonio – Rivercenter (15/70)
 Shenandoah – AMC Metropark Square 10

Virginia 
 Chantilly – Airbus IMAX Theater, Steven F. Udvar-Hazy Center (IMAX GT Laser, 1.43:1)
 McLean - AMC Tysons Corner 16
Ashburn - Regal Fox and IMAX

Washington 
Lynnwood – AMC Alderwood Mall 16 & IMAX
 Seattle – Boeing IMAX Theatre, Pacific Science Center (24.4m x 18.3m) (IMAX GT Laser, 1.43:1)

Notes

References

External links 
 Database of large format venues at LF Examiner

 
Lists of cinemas